This is a list of works by Italian/Venetian renaissance painter Giovanni Antonio Canal, better known as "Canaletto".

References

 
Canaletto